The Principal Charity Classic is an annual PGA Tour Champions golf tournament in Des Moines, Iowa. It has been held at the William Langford-designed Wakonda Club since 2013. Founded in 2001 as the Allianz Championship, that name has been used by another tournament in Florida since 2007.

The Principal Charity Classic, which raises money for Iowa children's charities, donated a record $6.7 million in 2020. This brought the event's charitable giving total to more than $30 million since 2007.

In September 2017, Principal announced the renewal of its title sponsorship through 2023. The event will remain at Wakonda Club.

Tournament venues
2001–2004: Glen Oaks Country Club, West Des Moines, Iowa
2005: Tournament Club of Iowa, Polk City, Iowa
2006–2012: Glen Oaks Country Club, West Des Moines, Iowa
2013–present: Wakonda Club, Des Moines, Iowa

Course layout
Wakonda Club

Winners

Notes

Multiple winners
Two players have won this tournament more than once through 2019.

3 wins: Jay Haas (2007, 2008, 2012)
2 wins: Bob Gilder (2002, 2011)

References

External links

Coverage on the PGA Tour Champions' official site
Wakonda Club – official site

PGA Tour Champions events
Golf in Iowa
Sports in Des Moines, Iowa
Recurring sporting events established in 2001